Saimir Kasemi (born 27 August 1988) is a German-Albanian former professional footballer who played as a defender.

References

1988 births
Living people
Footballers from Mannheim
German people of Albanian descent
German footballers
Albanian footballers
Association football defenders
Kategoria Superiore players
VfR Mannheim players
KF Tirana players
German expatriate footballers
German expatriate sportspeople in Albania
Expatriate footballers in Albania
Albanian expatriate sportspeople in Germany
Albanian expatriate footballers